Salazaria is a gossamer-winged butterfly genus of tribe Eumaeini in the subfamily Theclinae. As far as is known, these butterflies occur in the northern Andean region around Ecuador.

It is generally agreed that they represents a distinct lineage worthy of recognition as a full genus. However, there is some dispute about whether the name was validly established, or is a nomen nudum. The matter has been submitted to the ICZN for discussion.

Two named species are placed here. Several additional species assumed to belong here have also been discovered, but not yet described:
 Salazaria elizabetha (Salazar, Vélez & Johnson, 1997) Colombia
 Salazaria sala (Hewitson, 1867) Colombia
 ?Salazaria sp. 'Ecuador 1'
 ?Salazaria sp. 'Ecuador 2'
 ?Salazaria sp. 'Ecuador 3'
 ?Salazaria sp. 'Ecuador 4'
 ?Salazaria sp. 'Peru'

References

  (2010): Markku Savela's Lepidoptera and some other life forms – Salazaria'. Version of 2010-AUG-02. Retrieved 2011-MAY-30.

External links
Images representing Salazaria at Consortium for the Barcode of Life

Eumaeini
Lycaenidae of South America
Lycaenidae genera